Lieutenant Kenneth Lee Porter was a World War I flying ace credited with five aerial victories.

World War I service
Porter was an engineering graduate from the University of Michigan who joined the U.S. Army Air Service in August 1917. He reported to the 147th Aero Squadron in February 1918. While on patrol with Ralph O'Neill and four other American pilots, they shot down a Pfalz D.III over Château Thierry on 2 July. After switching his Nieuport 28 for a Spad XIII, Porter would score four more times, from 28 September through 12 October 1918, sharing his scores with Wilbert White, Francis Simonds, and three  other pilots. He also became a Flight Commander. He received the Distinguished Service Cross and the French Croix de Guerre.

Postwar
He worked for Burroughs Corporation and the Pesco Pump Co. in New York until World War II. During the war, he worked with Boeing. Afterwards, he returned to civilian engineering.

See also

 List of World War I flying aces from the United States

References

Bibliography
 American Aces of World War I. Norman Franks, Harry Dempsey. Osprey Publishing, 2001. , .

1896 births
1988 deaths
Recipients of the Distinguished Service Cross (United States)
Burials at Arlington National Cemetery
American World War I flying aces
Burroughs Corporation people
People from Dowagiac, Michigan
Recipients of the Croix de Guerre 1914–1918 (France)
University of Michigan alumni